LVMH Moët Hennessy Louis Vuitton, commonly known as LVMH, is a French multinational holding and conglomerate specializing in luxury goods, headquartered in Paris. The company was formed in 1987 through the merger of fashion house Louis Vuitton (founded in 1854) with Moët Hennessy, which was established following the 1971 merger between the champagne producer Moët & Chandon (founded in 1743) and the cognac producer Hennessy (founded in 1765). In 2021, with a valuation of $329 billion, LVMH became the most valuable company in Europe.

LVMH controls around 60 subsidiaries that manage 75 prestigious brands.These include Tiffany & Co., Christian Dior, Fendi, Givenchy, Marc Jacobs, Stella McCartney, Loewe, Loro Piana, Kenzo, Celine, Sephora, Princess Yachts, TAG Heuer, and Bulgari. The subsidiaries are often managed independently, under the umbrellas of six branches: Fashion Group, Wines and Spirits, Perfumes and Cosmetics, Watches and Jewelry, Selective Distribution, and Other Activities. The oldest of the LVMH brands is wine producer Château d'Yquem, which dates its origins back to 1593. Bernard Arnault is the chairman and CEO of LVMH.

History

In the 1980s, French investor Bernard Arnault had the idea to create a group of luxury brands. He worked with Alain Chevalier, CEO of Moët Hennessy, and Henry Racamier, president of Louis Vuitton, to form LVMH. Their successful integration of various famous aspirational brands into a single group inspired other luxury companies to do the same. Thus, the French conglomerate Kering and the Swiss-based Richemont have also created extended portfolios of luxury brands. LVMH is a component of the Euro Stoxx 50 stock market index.

Make Up For Ever was established in 1984, and was acquired by LVMH in 1999.

On 7 March 2011, LVMH announced the acquisition of the 50.4% family-owned shares of the Italian jeweler Bulgari and the intention to make a tender offer for the rest, which was publicly owned. The transaction was about $5.2 billion.

By 2012, LVMH established LCapitalAsia, a continuation of its private-equity arm, focused on Asia. In 2012, the growth of LVMH's sales "decreased by about 10 percent from the growth rate in 2011", and in early 2013 LVMH expressed that it would "stop opening stores in second and third-tier cities in mainland China". Xue Shengwen, a senior researcher at ChinaVenture, said the developing trend of young people is to take advantage of more acceptable prices. On 7 March 2013, National Business Daily reported that mid-priced clothing brand QDA would open its first store in Beijing, as a co-investment of LVMH's private equity LCapitalAsia and the Chinese apparel company Xin Hee Co., Ltd.

In February 2014, LVMH entered into a joint venture with the Italian fashion brand Marco De Vincenzo, taking a minority 45% stake in the firm.

In April 2017, LVMH announced it would gain ownership of Christian Dior haute couture, leather, men's and women's ready-to-wear, and footwear lines, to integrate the entire Christian Dior brand within its luxury group.

In January 2018, LVMH announced record sales of 42.6 billion euros in 2017, up 13% over the previous year, as all divisions turned in strong performances. In the same year, the net profit increased by 29%.

On 1 November 2018, co-founder Alain Chevalier died at age 87.

On 12 May 2019 the fashion house Fenty, styled as FEИTY, created by singer Rihanna was launched by LVMH in Paris. It is the first new fashion house by LVMH in 32 years and she is the first woman of colour to head a brand under LVMH.

On 15 July 2019, LVMH announced a new partnership to further develop the Stella McCartney House.

On 29 November 2019, LVMH announced its 55% stake in Château d’Esclans, the producer best known for the brand Whispering Angel. The acquisition was part of LVMH's move to offer a beloved high-end rosé portfolio, in addition to reaching customers worldwide.

In November 2019, LVMH expressed plans to acquire Tiffany & Co. for approximately US $16.2 billion. The deal was expected to close by June 2020. LVMH issued a statement in September 2020 indicating that the takeover would not proceed, and that the deal was "invalid" because of Tiffany's handling of the business during the COVID-19 pandemic. Subsequently, Tiffany filed suit against LVMH, asking the court to compel the purchase or to assess damages against the defendant; LVMH planned to counter sue, alleging that mismanagement had invalidated the purchase agreement.

In mid-September 2020, a reliable source told Forbes that the reason for Arnault's decision to cancel the Tiffany purchase was purely financial: because Tiffany was paying millions in dividends to shareholders despite a financial loss of US$32 million during the pandemic. Some US$70 million had already been paid out by Tiffany, with an additional US$70 million scheduled to be paid in November 2020. LVMH filed a counterclaim against the court action commenced by Tiffany; a statement issued by LMVH blamed Tiffany's mismanagement during the pandemic and claimed that it was 'burning cash and reporting losses'".

In late October 2020 Tiffany and LVMH agreed to the original takeover plan, though at a slightly reduced price of nearly $16 billion, a minor reduction of 2.6% from the aforementioned deal. The new deal reduced the amount paid per share by LVMH from the original price of $135 to $131.50. LVMH completed the purchase of Tiffany in January 2021.

In January 2022, LVMH acquired a minority stake in the New York-based label Aimé Leon Dore for an undisclosed sum. The investment was made through the conglomerate's LVMH Luxury Ventures arm.

As of late 2020, LVMH has the largest market capitalization of any company in France, and also in the Eurozone with a record of 261 billion euros ($317.6 billion). As of December 2020, Arnault's own fortune was nearly half that, with a personal net worth of $151.7 billion.

In March 2022, LVMH announced closure of its 120+ stores in Russia, "given the current circumstances in the region", due to the Russo-Ukrainian War. An LVMH spokesperson stated the company would continue to pay salary and benefits to its 3,500 employees in Russia.

In November 2022, it was announced LVMH had acquired the Piedmont-based jewelry maker, Pedemonte Group.

Corporate structure
LVMH is headquartered in the 8th arrondissement of Paris, France.

The company is listed on the Euronext Paris exchange, and is a constituent of the CAC 40 index.

As of 2010, the group had revenues of €20.3 billion with a net income of just over €3 billion. 
In 2013, with revenue of $21.7 billion, LVMH was ranked first luxury goods company in Deloitte's "Global Powers of Luxury Goods" report. By 29 February 2016, the company had a share value of 78,126 million euros, distributed in 506,980,299 shares.

As of 2009, the group employed more than 83,000 people, 30 percent of LVMH's staff worked in France, and LVMH operated over 2,400 stores worldwide.

Shareholders
At the end of 2017, the only declared major shareholder in LVMH was Arnault Family Group, the holding company of Bernard Arnault. The group's control amounted to 46.84% of LVMH's stock and 63.13% of its voting rights.

As of 2009, LVMH held 66% of the drinks division, Moët Hennessy, with the remaining 34% held by Diageo.

As of 2013, Christian Dior SE was the main holding company of LVMH, owning 40.9% of its shares, and 59.01% of its voting rights. Bernard Arnault is Chairman and CEO of LVMH and Chairman of Christian Dior SE. In 2017, Arnault purchased all the remaining Christian Dior shares in a reported $13.1 billion buyout.

Senior leadership 
Bernard Arnault has served as LVMH's chairman and CEO since January 1989. Alain Chevalier was chairman from 1987 until Arnault took over the role.

Subsidiaries 
A partial list including some of LVMH's best-known brands and subsidiaries:

 Wines and spirits
 Ao Yun
 Ardbeg
 Belvedere
 Bodega Numanthia
 Cape Mentelle
 Chandon
 Château d'Esclans
 Château Cheval Blanc
 Château d'Yquem
 Cheval des Andes
 Clos des Lambrays
 Cloudy Bay
 Colgin Cellars
 Dom Pérignon
 Glenmorangie
 Hennessy 
 Krug
 Mercier
 Moët & Chandon
 Newton Vineyard
 Ruinart
 Terrazas de los Andes
 Veuve Clicquot
 Volcan de mi Tierra
 Woodinville

 Fashion and leather goods
 Berluti
 Birkenstock
 Celine
 Christian Dior
 Emilio Pucci
 Fendi
 Givenchy
 JW Anderson
 Kenzo
 Loewe
 Loro Piana
 Louis Vuitton
 Marc Jacobs
 Moynat
 Off-White
 Patou
 Phoebe Philo
 Rimowa
 Stella McCartney

 Perfumes and cosmetics
 Acqua di Parma
 Benefit Cosmetics
 BITE Beauty
 Cha Ling
 Fenty Beauty by Rihanna
 Fresh Beauty
 Parfums Givenchy
 Guerlain
 Kenzo Parfums
 KVD Vegan Beauty
 Maison Francis Kurkdjian
 Make Up For Ever
 Marc Jacobs Beauty
 Officine Universelle Buly
 Ole Henriksen
 Parfums Christian Dior
 Perfumes Loewe
 Sephora

 Watches and jewelry
 Bulgari
 Chaumet
 Daniel Roth
 Fred
 Hublot
 Repossi
 TAG Heuer
 Tiffany & Co.
 Zenith

 Selective retailing
 DFS
 La Grande Epicerie
 La Samaritaine
 Le Bon Marché
 Starboard Cruise Services

 Other activities
 Belmond
 Maisons Cheval Blanc
 Connaissance des Arts
 Cova
 Investir
 Jardin d'Acclimatation
 Le Parisien
 Les Echos 
 Radio Classique
 Royal Van Lent

Journées Particulières
Launched in 2011,  Journées Particulières is a bi-annual event which allows visitors to enter the various ateliers, studios, caves, and mansions owned by LVMH, for free.

It is staged every two years and has opened doors in France, Italy, Switzerland, the UK, the Netherlands, Spain and Germany, with 56 brands welcoming guests into over 70 sites on four continents. The 2017 issue attracted 145,000 visitors.

Philanthropy

Visual arts
LVMH is a major patron of art in France. The group supported about ten exhibitions as "Le grand monde d’Andy Warhol" and "Picasso et les maîtres" at le Grand Palais in Paris. LVMH also endorsed the patronage of "l'atelier d'Alberto Giacometti" and "Yves Klein" at Centre Georges Pompidou.

Since 2005, when the LVMH flagship store opened in Paris at 3, avenue George V, 75008, the company presented close collaborations with contemporary artists. Features included a light sculpture by American James Turrell, a 20-metre (65 feet) long "travelling staircase" showcasing the work of American video artist Tim White-Sobieski and an elevator linking the store to the top floor by Iceland's Olafur Eliasson.

In 2006, a gallery space was inaugurated on the second floor of the same building and named "Espace Culturel". "Icônes" was one of the first exhibitions. Shigeru Ban, Sylvie Fleury, Zaha Hadid, Bruno Peinado, Andrée Putman, Ugo Rondinone, James Turrell, Tim White-Sobieski and Robert Wilson were the nine artists invited by Louis Vuitton to participate in it.

In addition, LVMH foundation created the "young creators LVMH award", an international competition opened to French and international beaux-arts students. Each year, six grants are allocated to the winners.

In 2014, LVMH opened the Fondation Louis Vuitton pour la Creation in a new building designed by Frank Gerry in the Bois de Boulogne in Paris. The Fondation is designed as the Group's own museum to present its collections and organize major world-class art exhibitions.

Fashion
In November 2013, LVMH created the LVMH Young Fashion Designer Prize, which comes with a €300,000 grant with a year of mentoring; it was the brainchild of Delphine Arnault. In February 2014 20 finalists for the inaugural prize were shown in London, including Simone Rocha, Thomas Tait, Meadham Kirchhoff, Marques'Almeida, J JS Lee, and others, and Thomas Tait was the winner. Marques'Almeida won the 2015 prize. In 2019, South African designer Thebe Magugu became the first African to win the prize, and was commended by the President of South Africa, Cyril Ramaphosa.

LVMH underwrites other fashion competitions, including the Andam prize in France, the International Festival of Fashion and Photography in Hyères, France, an investment fund for young designers created by the French Ministry of Culture and Communication, and a scholarship program and sponsored lecture theater at Central Saint Martins in London.

Music
The group also lends Stradivarius violins to young talented musicians. Maxim Vengerov and Laurent Korcia have used the instruments.

Humanitarian aid
On 26 August 2019, Bernard Arnault declared that LVMH would donate $11 million to help fight the 2019 Brazil wildfires.

During the COVID-19 crisis, the group shifted its production of perfume and spirits towards hand sanitizer. This production of 12 tons has been offered to hospitals in Paris, France.

In 2022, Louis Vuitton announced a €1 million donation to UNICEF to help the Ukrainian victims of the Russian invasion. On 2 March 2022, LVMH Group pledged €5 million to the Red Cross to those affected by the war. In addition, the company closed 124 of its stores in Russia.

E-commerce 
On 24 May 2018, LVMH launched an e-commerce initiative by investing in online fashion search business Lyst, as a way for LVMH's luxury brands to expand their presence online and capture younger shoppers. LVMH contributed to Lyst's $60 million funding round, which also included access to LVMH's international expertise, designed to drive Lyst's global expansion.

Financial data

Controversy

John Galliano's anti-semitism 

On 25 February 2011, Christian Dior announced they had suspended designer John Galliano following his arrest over an alleged anti-semitic tirade in a Paris bar. In France, it is against the law to make anti-semitic remarks of this nature, and it can be punished by up to six months in prison. On 1 March 2011, Christian Dior officially announced that it had fired Galliano amidst the controversy.

Sebastian Suhl 

In 2012 former Prada COO Sebastian Suhl was hired by Givenchy as the company's new CEO. The Asian Transnational Corporation Monitoring Network (ATNC), a network made of 15 organizations from 12 Asian countries wrote a letter of concern to LVMH Group's Bernard Arnault as Suhl was at the same time a key person in the Prada Female Discrimination Case where he described as complicit in sexual harassment and discrimination practices.

Corruption

During December 2021, LVMH paid €10 million to settle claims in Paris to end several criminal investigations that a former French intelligence chief, Bernard Squarcini, spied for the company, on competitors and others, including on an activist making a film about its billionaire owner, Bernard Arnault.  Prosecutors allege that the intelligence chief used tactics like influence peddling, invasion of privacy, and leveraging his network in intelligence and police on behalf of the company.

See also 

 Estée Lauder Companies
 Richemont
 Kering
 Luxottica

References

External links 

Marques de LVMH classées par secteurs d'activités 

 
8th arrondissement of Paris
CAC 40
Companies in the Euro Stoxx 50
Companies listed on Euronext Paris
Conglomerate companies of France
French companies established in 1987
Hennessy family
History of cosmetics
Holding companies established in 1987
Hospitality companies of France
Luxury brand holding companies
Manufacturing companies based in Paris
Multinational companies headquartered in France
Retail companies established in 1987
Watchmaking conglomerates
Clothing companies based in New York City